Hans von Gersdorff, also known as Schyl-Hans, (* approx. 1455; † 1529 in Strasbourg) was a well-known surgeon who published the Feldbuch der Wundarzney ("Field book of surgery") in 1517 (published by Johannes Schott in Strasbourg), with instructions for procedures such as amputation. It was illustrated with woodcuts attributed to Hans Wechtlin.

Gallery

Literature 
 Hans von Gersdorff: Feldbuch der Wundarznei. (Darmstadt: Wissenschaftliche Buchgesellschaft, 1967). Reprint of the 1517 edition.
 
 
 Johann Ludwig Choulant: History and bibliography of anatomic illustration. Trans. and annotated by Mortimer Frank. (New York: Hafner, 1962). S. 162-166.
 Morton's Medical Bibliography (Garrison and Morton). Ed. By Jeremy Norman. 5th ed. (Aldershot, Hants., England : Scolar Press ; Brookfield, Vt., USA : Gower Pub. Co., 1991). No. 5560.

References

External links 

 
 Digitalisierte Werke von Gersdorff  - SICD der Universitäten von Strasbourg
 Images from Feldtbůch der Wundtartzney From The College of Physicians of Philadelphia Digital Library

1529 deaths
German surgeons
Year of birth unknown